Götamål is one of the six different dialect areas of the Swedish language, mostly heard in Västergötland, Dalsland, northern Halland, northern Småland and Östergötland. However, it is also heard in Bohuslän and Värmland. Examples of Götamål features are vowel reduction, vowel shortening in front of endings and loss of—r in suffixes (as in hästa' (hästar = horses)).

See also 
 Swedish language
 Swedish dialects

References
 Götamål in Swedish at NE.se
 Mimersbrunn (about all Swedish dialect areas in Swedish)

Swedish dialects
Västergötland
Dalsland